Wang Jin (born 19 February 1997) is a Chinese freestyle skier. She competed in the 2018 Winter Olympics, in the moguls event.

References

1997 births
Living people
Freestyle skiers at the 2018 Winter Olympics
Chinese female freestyle skiers
Olympic freestyle skiers of China
Skiers from Heilongjiang
People from Hegang